Azrael is the traditional name of the angel of death in many religions.

Azrael may also refer to:

Characters
 Azrael (comics), DC Comics
 Azrael, a mysterious character with the same alias who was an ally of the Teen Titans.
 Azrael (comic book), an American comic book series, published by DC Comics 
 Commander Azrael, Warhammer 40,000
 Muruta Azrael, a fictional character in the anime Mobile Suit Gundam SEED
 Bruno Azrael, a fictional character in the anime Gundam SEED DESTINY
 Dogma (film), has a character named Azrael
 Azrael, the cat of Gargamel, the villain in The Smurfs
 Rabbi Azrael, a main character in the play The Dybbuk, by S. Ansky
 Princess Asrial, a character in the American comic book series Ninja High School
 Azrael, a single-appearance character in The Amazing World of Gumball
 "Azrael" (Gotham character), a character in Gotham
 Azrael, a transdimensional demon of light from Brave Saga 2
 Azrael, a fictional character from the BlazBlue series

People
 Abu Azrael (born 1978), also known as the "Angel of Death" (Arabic: ملاك الموت), is a commander of the Kataib al-Imam Ali, an Iraqi Shi'a militia group of the Popular Mobilization Forces that is fighting ISIL/ISIS (Islamic State of Iraq and the Levant) in Iraq
 Deborah Azrael, Harvard School of Public Health researcher
 Edward Azrael (1907–2001), American lawyer
 Jeremy Azrael (1935–2009), American political scientist and father of Deborah
 Judith Azrael (born 1938), American writer
 Louis Azrael (1904–1981), American journalist
 Mary Azrael (born 1944), American author and poet

Other uses
 Asrael, an opera by Alberto Franchetti that premiered in 1888
 Asrael Symphony (1905–1906), a symphony by Josef Suk
 "Azrael" (Gotham episode), an episode of Gotham

See also
 Azriel (disambiguation)
 Asriel (disambiguation)